Erythranthe inflatula, synonyms Mimulus inflatulus and Mimulus evanescens, is a rare species of monkeyflower known by the common name disappearing monkeyflower. It is native to the western United States, where it is known from about ten locations in and around the Great Basin within the states of Idaho, Oregon, and California; it is also found in Nevada. Specimens of the plant had been catalogued as Mimulus breviflorus (now Erythranthe breviflora), but on further examination it was evident that they were a separate, unclassified species; this was described to science in 1995. It is thought that the plant may have evolved via hybridization between Erythranthe breviflora and Erythranthe latidens, or that it evolved from E. latidens and then into E. breviflora.

Erythranthe inflatula is a succulent annual herb coated with tiny glandular hairs and having a somewhat slimy texture. The thin stems grow mostly erect to a maximum height near . The flowers are small and barely open, their tubular bases enclosed in a ribbed calyx of sepals, which becomes papery and inflated as the fruits mature.

Erythranthe inflatula has been observed in rocky sagebrush habitat, especially in areas still moist from early spring soaking. Most of the areas where the plant grows are on rangeland used for grazing livestock. Threats to the plant include land degradation from cattle grazing, encroachment by invasive plant species, and changes in the hydrology of the plant's vernally wet habitat.

References

External links
Jepson eFlora treatment of Mimulus evanescens
Jepson Manual Status Page
USDA Plants Profile for Mimulus evanescens
CNPS Rare Plant Profile
Mimulus evanescens — UC Photo gallery

inflatula
Flora of Idaho
Flora of Oregon
Flora of California
Flora of Nevada
Flora of the Great Basin
Plants described in 1995
Succulent plants